Kyle Michael Scott (born December 22, 1997) is a professional soccer player who plays as a midfielder for Orange County SC. Born in England, he has played international soccer at youth level for three countries, most recently the United States under-20 national team.

Club career

Chelsea
Scott joined Chelsea in 2007 as under-10 from Southampton and went onto make his under-18 debut in August 2013. Scott subsequently made his UEFA Youth League debut at the age of 15 before making his first European start in early 2014. In April 2016, Scott reportedly handed in a transfer request following a lack of first-team opportunities and a few months later, he joined Dutch side Willem II on a short-term trial period with a view to a loan move. However, this supposed move broke down.

Preceding the 2017–18 campaign, Scott was promoted to the first-team squad and was given the number 36 jersey. Following several matchday squad appearances, Scott finally made his first-team debut during Chelsea's 4–0 home victory over Hull City in the FA Cup fifth round on February 16, 2018.

On July 14, 2018, Scott agreed to join Dutch second-tier side Telstar on a season-long loan. On the opening day of the 2018–19 campaign, Scott went onto make his Telstar debut during their 1–0 away defeat to RKC Waalwijk, replacing Anass Najah in the 63rd minute.

He was released by Chelsea on July 1, 2019.

Newcastle United
On July 29, 2019, Newcastle United announced the signing of Kyle Scott on a two-year deal.

On June 1, 2021, Newcastle announced that Scott would be released at the end of his contract that summer.

FC Cincinnati
On August 31, 2021, Scott joined Major League Soccer club FC Cincinnati on a deal lasting until the end of the 2022 season. On February 2, 2022, Scott and Cincinnati mutually agreed to terminate his contract with the club.

Orange County SC
On August 4, 2022, Scott signed with USL Championship side Orange County SC for the remainder of the season.

International career
Scott has represented England at the under-16 level, Republic of Ireland at under-17 level, and United States at both under-18 and under-20 levels. He is also eligible for Italy.

Career statistics

Honours
Chelsea Reserves
 FA Youth Cup: 2013–14, 2014–15, 2015–16
 UEFA Youth League: 2014–15, 2015–16

References

External links

1997 births
Living people
People from Bath, Somerset
Citizens of the United States through descent
American soccer players
United States men's youth international soccer players
English footballers
England youth international footballers
Republic of Ireland association footballers
Republic of Ireland youth international footballers
Association football midfielders
Chelsea F.C. players
SC Telstar players
Newcastle United F.C. players
FC Cincinnati players 
Orange County SC players 
American people of English descent
American people of Irish descent
American people of Italian descent
English people of American descent
Sportspeople of American descent
English people of Irish descent
English people of Italian descent
Irish people of American descent
Irish people of English descent
Irish people of Italian descent